This is a list of women who are or have been police and crime commissioners in England and Wales.
List of female police and crime commissioners

References 

Police and crime commissioners
 Women
Police and crime